Pueblo Nuevo District is one of the eleven districts of the Chincha Province in Peru.

Districts of the Ica Region
1965 establishments in Peru
States and territories established in 1965